Niccolò Albergati-Ludovisi (15 September 16089 August 1687) was an Italian Catholic Cardinal and Archbishop of Bologna.

Biography
He was a cousin of Cardinal Ludovico Ludovisi.
On 16 September 1640, he was consecrated bishop by Giovanni Battista Pamphilj, Cardinal-Priest of Sant'Eusebio with Giovanni Battista Rinuccini, Archbishop of Fermo, and Lelio Falconieri, Titular Archbishop of Thebae, serving as co-consecrators.

On 6 February 1645 he was appointed Archbishop of Bologna, and on 6 March 1645 he was elevated to cardinal by Pope Innocent X. He served as Cardinal-Priest of the Basilica di Sant'Agostino and then the Santa Maria degli Angeli e dei Martiri.

In 1650 he was appointed Major Penitentiary, and in 1683 he was appointed Dean of the College of Cardinals. He held both position until his death. Between 1658 and 1659 he served as Camerlengo of the Sacred College of Cardinals.

Episcopal succession

References and notes

1608 births
1687 deaths
17th-century Italian cardinals
Cardinal-bishops of Frascati
Cardinal-bishops of Palestrina
17th-century Italian Roman Catholic archbishops